Jakub Myszor (born 7 June 2002) is a Polish professional footballer who plays as a winger for Cracovia.

Career statistics

Club

Notes

References

2002 births
Living people
People from Tychy
Polish footballers
Poland youth international footballers
Poland under-21 international footballers
Association football midfielders
Ekstraklasa players
III liga players
MKS Cracovia (football) players